The 1931–32 Ljubljana Subassociation League was the 13th season of the Ljubljana Subassociation League. Ilirija won the league.

Final table

References

External links
Football Association of Slovenia 

Slovenian Republic Football League seasons
Yugo
1
Football
Football